In Finland, the Suomen mestaruus (SM; ‘Finnish Champion’) is the winner of the highest level of national competition in a particular sport. Suomen mestaruussarja (Finnish for ‘Finnish Championship’) is the competition in which the winning athlete, team, or club is named Finnish Champion. The abbreviation SM-sarja is often used when discussing the highest-level league of a sport that competes for the Finnish Championship or the specific competition in which a Finnish Champion is named. The abbreviation SM-liiga (Finnish Champion’s League) is commonly used when discussing the premier league of a sport that has been designated with liiga status; though SM-liiga can refer to any Finnish Championship league, it is most often used when discussing the men's ice hockey Liiga.

Sports in which the Finnish Championship is contested

References
Significant content in this article is translated from the existing Finnish Wikipedia article at :fi:Suomen-mestaruus; see its history for attribution.

Athletics in Finland
Bandy in Finland
Baseball in Finland
Basketball in Finland
Floorball in Finland
American football in Finland
Football in Finland
Futsal in Finland
Handball in Finland
Ice hockey in Finland
Rugby union in Finland
Running in Finland
Volleyball in Finland
Finland sport-related lists